Senator Bailey may refer to:

Members of the United States Senate
James E. Bailey (1822–1885), U.S. Senator from Tennessee from 1877 to 1881
Joseph Weldon Bailey (1862–1929), U.S. Senator from Texas from 1901 to 1913
Josiah Bailey (1873–1946), U.S. Senator from North Carolina between 1931 and 1946
Theodorus Bailey (politician) (1758–1828), U.S. Senator from New York from 1803 to 1804

United States state senate member
Alexander H. Bailey (1817–1874), New York State Senate
Benny Ray Bailey (born 1944), Kentucky State Senate
Billy Wayne Bailey (born 1957), West Virginia State Senate
Dana Reed Bailey (1833–1908), Vermont State Senate and Wisconsin State Senate
Daniel A. Bailey (1894–1970), Pennsylvania State Senate
David Jackson Bailey (1812–1897), Georgia State Senate
Goldsmith Bailey (1823–1862), Massachusetts State Senate
Jamaal Bailey (fl. 2010s), New York State Senate
Jack Bailey (Maryland politician) (born 1965), Maryland State Senate
John H. Bailey (1864–1940), Texas State Senate
John O. Bailey (1880–1959), Oregon State Senate
Joseph Bailey (congressman) (1810–1885), Pennsylvania State Senate
Martin B. Bailey (1857–1934), Illinois State Senate
Morton Shelley Bailey (1855–1922), Colorado State Senate
Paul Bailey (politician) (born 1968), Tennessee State Senate
Taber D. Bailey (1874–1938), Maine State Senate